OMG! Jedward's Dream Factory is an Irish children's reality television series starring pop duo Jedward.

In each episode, Jedward helped to fulfil the wishes of children who had written in to the show. The wishes involve such activities as meeting players from Manchester United, swimming with a dolphin, interviewing TV presenter Ryan Tubridy, meeting pop group The Saturdays and reading the television news, as well as wishes involving Jedward themselves. Every episode begins with a musical performance from Jedward.

The first series was nominated for best Children's/Youth Programme in the 2012 Irish Film & Television Academy Awards and won best Online PR Campaign in the 2012 Bord Gáis Energy Social Media Awards. The second series was nominated for best Children's/Youth Programme in the 2013 Irish Film & Television Academy Awards

The first series of OMG! Jedward's Dream Factory began broadcast on Christmas Day 2011, playing every day until 3 January. The second series also began broadcast on Christmas Day 2012 and screened until 4 January, with no show on 31 December.

In 2013, RTÉ announced that the show format would be relaunched as Una’s Dream Ticket, hosted by The Saturdays member Una Healy.

Episodes

Series 1 (2011–12)

Series 2 (2012–13)

References

External links

2011 Irish television series debuts
2013 Irish television series endings
Irish children's television shows
Jedward